Čaklov is a village and municipality in Vranov nad Topľou District in the Prešov Region of eastern Slovakia.

History
In historical records the village was first mentioned in 1282.

Geography
The municipality lies at an altitude of 135 metres and covers an area of 12.759 km².

Population
According to the 2011 census, the municipality had 2,442 inhabitants. 1,795 of inhabitants were Slovaks, 429 Roma  and 218 others and unspecified.

See also
 List of municipalities and towns in Slovakia

References

Genealogical resources

The records for genealogical research are available at the state archive "Statny Archiv in Presov, Slovakia"

 Roman Catholic church records (births/marriages/deaths): 1769-1910 (parish B)
 Greek Catholic church records (births/marriages/deaths): 1796-1951 (parish B)

External links
 
 
Surnames of living people in Caklov

Villages and municipalities in Vranov nad Topľou District
Zemplín (region)